The London Liberal Democrats are the regional party of the Liberal Democrats that operates in Greater London. The organisation is associated with the English Liberal Democrats.

Mayoral candidates 
In 2008, Baron Brian Paddick became the first openly LGBT candidate to run for a mainstream political party for the role of Mayor of London.

Current representatives

Members of Parliament 
 Ed Davey  Kingston and Surbiton
 Sarah Olney  Richmond Park and North Kingston
 Munira Wilson  Twickenham

London Assembly members 
 Hina Bokhari
 Caroline Pidgeon

Councillors

Electoral performance

UK general elections 
The table below shows the London Liberal Democrats results at UK general elections since the area of Greater London was created.

Greater London Council elections 
The table below shows the results obtained by the London Liberal Party in elections to the Greater London Council. The GLC was abolished by the Local Government Act 1985.

Mayoral elections 
The table below shows the London Liberal Democrats results in London Mayoral elections since 2000.

Assembly elections 
The table below shows the London Liberal Democrats results in London Assembly elections since 2000.

Local elections

References

External links 
 

Organisation of the Liberal Democrats (UK)
Politics of London
Organisations based in the City of Westminster
1988 establishments in the United Kingdom
Organisations associated with the Liberal Democrats (UK)